Heppnerographa ardea is a species of moth of the family Tortricidae. It is found in Ecuador.

The wingspan is 22 mm. The ground colour of the forewings is pale golden yellow with distinct glossy dots forming a series of blotches. The markings are golden brown edged with pearl white. The hindwings are creamy, suffused ochreous along the margins.

References

Moths described in 1999
Heppnerographa
Moths of South America
Taxa named by Józef Razowski